Horsley is a suburb in Wollongong. It is the location of the new Dapto Primary school and a community centre. This suburb has expanded since 1999 and contains many newly developed houses.

Geography
Horsley has a small shop area. It is surrounded by parkland, skatepark grounds and playing fields to the east (in the narrow area separating it from Dapto, and farmland to the north, west and south. West of Horsley is Mount Bong Bong, part of the Illawarra escarpment range and the Dapto cliffs, providing a towering backdrop. Much of the land about is the last remaining land available to housing developers and much growth is possible. There is a shooting range west of Horsley reached via Bong Bong Road.

Demographics
As of the 2016 Census Night there were 8,221 persons counted in Horsley, 48.8% were males and 51.2% were females. Of the total population 2.6% were of Indigenous origin. The previous Dapto primary school was moved here in 2004.

Dapto Public School
The school used to be located on Byamee Street in the neighbouring suburb of Dapto. The school site is now on Sierra Drive, Horsley in a predominantly residential area.

World War II aircraft crash
On 4 November 1942, a Royal Australian Air Force Lockheed Hudson crashed on Bong Bong Mountain, just west of Horsley, killing all four crew members.

References

Suburbs of Wollongong